Poland competed at the 1969 European Athletics Championships in Athens, Greece, from 16-21 September 1969. A delegation of 52 athletes were sent to represent the country.

Medals

References

European Athletics Championships
1969
Nations at the 1969 European Athletics Championships